The spouse of the Chief Executive of Hong Kong is the wife or husband of the Chief Executive of Hong Kong. There have been four women and one man that have occupied this role. There is no official formal title for the spouse of the Chief Executive of Hong Kong.

Officeholders

List

Living former first ladies and gentleman

See also

 Chief Executive of Hong Kong

References

Spouse
Hong Kong